The 1974 Chicago Cubs season was the 103rd season of the Chicago Cubs franchise, the 99th in the National League and the 59th at Wrigley Field. The Cubs finished sixth and last in the National League East with a record of 66–96.

Offseason 
 October 25, 1973: Ferguson Jenkins was traded by the Cubs to the Texas Rangers for Bill Madlock and Vic Harris.
 November 3, 1973: Bob Locker was traded by the Cubs to the Oakland Athletics for Horacio Piña.
 November 7, 1973: Glenn Beckert and Bobby Fenwick were traded by the Cubs to the San Diego Padres for Jerry Morales.
 December 11, 1973: Ron Santo was traded by the Cubs to the Chicago White Sox for Steve Stone, Ken Frailing, and Steve Swisher and a player to be named later. The White Sox completed the deal by sending Jim Kremmel to the Cubs on December 18.
 March 19, 1974: Ken Rudolph was traded by the Cubs to the San Francisco Giants for Willie Prall.

Regular season 
 July 31, 1974: Bill Bonham had four strikeouts in one inning.

Season standings

Record vs. opponents

Notable transactions 
 April 1, 1974: Paul Popovich was traded by the Cubs to the Pittsburgh Pirates for Tom Dettore and cash.
 June 5, 1974: George Riley was drafted by the Cubs in the 4th round of the 1974 Major League Baseball Draft.
 June 17, 1974: Oscar Zamora was purchased by the Cubs from the Houston Astros.
 July 28, 1974: Horacio Piña was traded by the Cubs to the California Angels for Rick Stelmaszek.

Roster

Player stats

Batting

Starters by position 
Note: Pos = Position; G = Games played; AB = At bats; H = Hits; Avg. = Batting average; HR = Home runs; RBI = Runs batted in

Other batters 
Note: G = Games played; AB = At bats; H = Hits; Avg. = Batting average; HR = Home runs; RBI = Runs batted in

Pitching

Starting pitchers 
Note: G = Games pitched; IP = Innings pitched; W = Wins; L = Losses; ERA = Earned run average; SO = Strikeouts

Other pitchers 
Note: G = Games pitched; IP = Innings pitched; W = Wins; L = Losses; ERA = Earned run average; SO = Strikeouts

Relief pitchers 
Note: G = Games pitched; W = Wins; L = Losses; SV = Saves; ERA = Earned run average; SO = Strikeouts

Farm system 

LEAGUE CHAMPIONS: GCL Cubs

Notes

References 

1974 Chicago Cubs season at Baseball Reference

Chicago Cubs seasons
Chicago Cubs season
Chicago Cubs